Diospyros andamanica is a tree in the family Ebenaceae. Twigs are rusty brown or blackish. Inflorescences bear up to 30 or more flowers. The tree is named after the Andaman Islands. Habitat is mixed dipterocarp forests from sea level to  altitude. D. andamanica is found in the Andaman Islands, Sumatra, Peninsular Malaysia and Borneo.

References

andamanica
Flora of the Andaman Islands
Trees of Sumatra
Trees of Peninsular Malaysia
Trees of Borneo
Plants described in 1870